Zera Shimshon is a Jewish text Zera means seed (of).

Written by Shimshon Chaim Nachmani, a kabbalist (Moreinu HaRav Shimshon Chaim ben Reb Nachman 
Michoel, died 1779) who lived in Italy.

As is common for Jewish texts, the name of the work is also used to identify the author.

Source of merit
The only child of the 1706-born author of this work died as a child. Zera Shimshon was written in memory of that child, and its author wrote that studying it would lead to heavenly blessings.

Subjects
The Zera Shimshon contains approximately 774 essays arranged in 59 chapters. These chapters represent the 54 parashot of the Pentateuch, and the Five Megillot, viz: Song of Songs, Book of Ruth, Lamentations, Book of Esther, and Ecclesiastes.

Besides the full Hebrew/Aramaic editions of Zera Shimshon, a number of editions have been prepared of portions of the book, often with explanatory commentary, including:

Book of Esther,

Shir HaShirim.

Zera Shimshon Hamevuar on Eishes Chayil

Haggadah Zera Shimshon 

Besides the Zera Shimshon, the author also published a book entitled "Toldot Shimshon," which is a commentary on Pirkei Avot.

Biography
Born in Modena, his father, Nachman Michoel, arranged for him to initially study with the local rabbi, Ephraim Cohen Lipshitz, his maternal grandfather. He subsequently studied in Mantua with its rabbi, Abiad Sar-Shalom Bazilla, author of a work named "Emunat Chachamim." Later on he studied Kabbalah in Reggio with its rabbi, Benjamin Alexander HaKohen Vitali.

Ordained, he initially moved to Mantua, becoming a local teacher, subsequently returning to Modena to both teach and lead a congregation.
His main work Zera Shimshon (commentary on Chumash and Five Megillot) was published in Mantua (1778); his Toldot Shimshon on Pirke Avot was published in Leghorn (1776).

References

External links
 Zera Shimshon Organization (organizes study groups, publishes a weekly "Gilyon")
 Weekly (multi-lingual) Zera Shimshon Podcast
 English-language translations of selected essays from Zera Shimshon

Orthodox rabbis
Jewish texts